A list of British films released in 2003.

2003

See also
 2003 in film
 2003 in British music
 2003 in British radio
 2003 in British television
 2003 in the United Kingdom
 List of 2003 box office number-one films in the United Kingdom

External links

2003
Films
British